United States v. Cooley (2021) was a Supreme Court of the United States case on the powers of tribal police.

Background

The case stemmed from a 2016 incident where a tribal police officer detained a non-tribal motorist found with guns and drugs. In lower courts it had been argued that evidence gathered by Native American police should not be admissible in cases regarding non-Native Americans.

Decision

The case was argued on March 23, 2021. The case was decided unanimously on June 1, 2021, allowing tribal police to detain and investigate those suspected of criminal activity on tribal lands regardless of racial status. The court found that in such cases non-natives may be detained when on a public right of way inside a reservation. Non-native detainees may be detained for a reasonable length of time until non-tribal police can arrive at the scene to handle the incident. The opinion for the case was written by Justice Stephen Breyer. A concurring opinion was written by Justice Samuel Alito.

References 

Native American tribal police
2021 in United States case law
United States Supreme Court cases
United States Supreme Court cases of the Roberts Court
United States Native American case law